"The Main Event" is a single by southern rapper Chamillionaire. It is the second single from his cancelled studio album Venom. It features Texas rappers Slim Thug, Paul Wall and Dorrough, and was produced by Scott "CHOPS" Jung. It was later featured on his Greatest Verses mixtapes.

History 
It was leaked onto the internet on February 10, 2010 for the 2010 NBA All-Star Game in Dallas, TX. The song was officially released on June 8, 2010 to the iTunes Store.

Music video 
According to Chamillionare's YouTube account the music video is coming soon The video was directed in Downtown Houston, Texas by Dr. Teeth and features a cameo by fellow Texas rapper Bun B. But the video was never released due to Chamillionaires release from Universal Records.

References 

2010 singles
2010 songs
Chamillionaire songs
Dorrough songs
Paul Wall songs
Slim Thug songs
Songs written by Chamillionaire
Songs written by Paul Wall
Universal Republic Records singles